West Wyalong Airport  is an airport located  south West Wyalong, New South Wales, Australia. The airport is operated by the Bland Shire Council.

Facilities and aircraft
West Wyalong Airport has two runways:
Runway 09/27: , surface: asphalt
Runway 04/22: , surface: gravel

Airlines and destinations
Currently West Wyalong is not serviced by any scheduled flights, but throughout the airport's history it has been served by many regional airlines. East-West Airlines operated services to Sydney from 1953 until 1975, initially using converted ex-military Lockheed Hudson aircraft, later replaced by the Douglas DC-3 and Fokker F27 Friendship. These services were discontinued with the withdrawal of Government subsidy on 30 June 1975.

A number of smaller carriers would later service the West Wyalong - Sydney route, including Country Connection Airlines who provided 11 services per week between 1991 and 2001 using Piper Chieftain aircraft.

Rex Airlines provided twice weekly service to Sydney commencing in March 2005. The airline carried 1,928 passengers in the first six months, but it ceased operating the flights in September 2007.

See also
List of airports in New South Wales

References

External links

Airports in New South Wales